Hungatella xylanolytica is a xylanolytic bacterium from the genus of Hungatella.

References

Clostridiaceae
Bacteria described in 1988
Bacillota